Zabaykalsky (masculine), Zabaykalskaya (feminine), or Zabaykalskoye (neuter) may refer to:

Zabaykalsky Krai, a federal subject of Russia
Zabaykalsky District, a district of Zabaykalsky Krai, Russia
Zabaykalsky (rural locality) (Zabaykalskaya, Zabaykalskoye), name of several rural localities in Russia
Zabaykalsky National Park, a national park in the Republic of Buryatia, Russia